is a railway station and major stop along the Aoimori Railway Line in the city of Aomori in Aomori Prefecture, Japan. It is operated by the third sector railway operator Aoimori Railway Company.

Passenger trains serve the station 17 and a half hours a day; the departure time between trains is roughly 30 minutes during the morning peak with reduced frequency at other times.

Location

Surrounding area
Asamushi Aquarium
Asamushi Onsen
Asamushi-Natsudomari Prefectural Natural Park
Asamushi Post Office

Station layout
Asamushi-Onsen Station has an island platform and a side platform serving three tracks. The platform is connected to the station building by a footbridge. The station building is attended from 6:30 a.m. to 5:30 p.m.

Platforms

History
It became a station on the Tōhoku Main Line of the Japanese Government Railways (JGR), the pre-war predecessor to the Japanese National Railways (JNR), after the nationalization of the Nippon Railway on 1 November 1906. Regularly scheduled freight services were discontinued in February 1962. The station was renamed as Asamushi-Onsen Station on 1 November 1986. With the privatization of JNR on 1 April 1987, it came under the operational control of East Japan Railway Company (JR East).

The section of the Tōhoku Main Line including this station was transferred to Aoimori Railway on 4 December 2010.

Services

The station is primarily served by trains operating on a local service on the Aoimori Railway Line between Aomori and Hachinohe. Passenger trains serve Asamushi-Onsen Station for 17 and a half hours each day from 6:01am to 11:31pm. At peak hours between the first train and 9:16am, trains depart from the station roughly every 30 minutes; otherwise trains depart at an approximate hourly basis. In 2018, a daily average of 683 passengers boarded trains at Asamushi-Onsen Station, an increase from the daily average of 330 passengers the station served in 2010, the final year of its ownership by JR East. In 2018, the station was the ninth busiest on the Aoimori Railway Line, excluding Aomori and Hachinohe stations, and the least busiest along the line in the city of Aomori.

Bus services
Aomori City Bus
Aomori Station via Nonai

Mutsu Bus Terminal via Hiranai, Noheji Station, Arito Station, Yokohama, Chikagawa Station
Shin-Aomori Station via Aomori Prefectural Office

See also
List of railway stations in Japan

References

External links

 

Railway stations in Aomori Prefecture
Railway stations in Japan opened in 1891
Aomori (city)
Aoimori Railway Line